Shuniah is a municipal township bordering the city of Thunder Bay, Ontario, Canada on the east.  Shuniah was incorporated by an act of the Ontario legislature in 1873, and at that time included much of present-day Thunder Bay and its predecessor and surrounding municipalities. It gradually shrunk in size until by 1936 it included only three wards, the geographic townships of McIntyre, McGregor, and McTavish. That year it had the Ontario Legislative Assembly remove a number of islands in Lake Superior that had formed the Island Ward since 1873. In 1970 McIntyre Township was amalgamated into the city of Thunder Bay. Shuniah, named after the Ojibwa word "zhooniyaa" for "money" or "silver" (see the French argent), was settled largely due to silver mining potential identified in the mid-19th century.

The township is part of Thunder Bay's Census Metropolitan Area, and consists of the communities of Amethyst Harbour, Ancliff, Bowker, Ishkibibble, Loon, Mackenzie, Navilus, Pass Lake, Pearl, Silver Harbour and Wild Goose.

Serving today primarily as a rural bedroom community to Thunder Bay, Shuniah is also a popular cottaging locale with 40 kilometres of Lake Superior's northern shoreline.  The township was home to the Lake Superior Trout Hunt during the 1970s and 1980s.

From 1994 to 2014, the township reeve was Maria Harding.  On October 27, 2014, Wendy Landry was elected as Reeve and as of January 26, 2015 the title of the Head of Council was changed from Reeve to Mayor.  Landry was re-elected in 2018.

Demographics 

See also
 List of townships in Ontario

References

External links

Municipalities in Thunder Bay District
Single-tier municipalities in Ontario
Populated places on Lake Superior in Canada